Iva Budařová and Sandra Wasserman won in the final 1–6, 6–3, 6–2 against Anna-Karin Olsson and María José Llorca.

Seeds
Champion seeds are indicated in bold text while text in italics indicates the round in which those seeds were eliminated.

 Bettina Fulco /  Arantxa Sánchez (quarterfinals)
 Emilse Raponi-Longo /  Patricia Medrado (quarterfinals)
 Andrea Tiezzi /  Adriana Villagrán (first round)
 Céline Cohen /  Mariana Pérez-Roldán (quarterfinals)

Draw

External links
 ITF tournament edition details

Doubles